The Genuine Article is the debut studio album by American rapper and record producer Remedy. It was released on April 17, 2001 via Fifth Angel Recordings. Recording sessions took place at 36 Chambers Studio and Quad Recording Studios in Manhattan, at North Shore Soundworks in Long Island, at Ameraycan Studios in North Hollywood, and at Alien Flyers in New York. Production was handled by Remedy himself, except for "Warning", which was produced by fellow Wu-Tang Clan affiliate 4th Disciple. It features guest appearances from Cappadonna, Children Of The World, Clocka, Solomon Childs, Sweetleaf, RZA and Lounge Lo. The album peaked at number 130 on the US Billboard 200 albums chart.

Track listing

Personnel
Ross "Remedy" Filler – main artist, producer (tracks: 1-12), recording, mixing, engineering, executive producer, sleeve notes
Robert "RZA" Diggs – featured artist (track 1)
Children Of The World – featured artist (tracks: 1, 10)
R. "Solomon Childs" Lynwood – featured artist (tracks: 3, 6)
Darryl "Cappadonna" Hill – featured artist (tracks: 3, 9)
Sweetleaf – featured artist (tracks: 8, 13)
Hassan "Clocka" Johnson – featured artist (tracks: 11, 13)
A. "Lounge Lo" Cornelius – featured artist (track 11)
Selwyn "4th Disciple" Bogard – producer (track 13)
Charlie Marotta – engineering
Dragen Casanovic – engineering
Tony Dawsey – mastering
Brian Frank – art direction, design, photography
John Pecoraro – management
Al James – project coordinator

Charts

References

External links

2001 debut albums
Remedy (rapper) albums
Albums produced by 4th Disciple